A pest house was a type of building in which to quarantine those afflicted with communicable diseases.

Pest House is the name of the following historic buildings in the US:
 Pest House (Concord, Massachusetts)
 Pest House (Stillwater, Minnesota)

See also 
 "The Pest House", an episode in the American TV series Millennium